Conospermum ericifolium is a slender shrub of the family Proteaceae native to eastern Australia. The habitat is drier eucalyptus woodlands or heathland. The specific epithet ericifolium refers to the similarity of the leaves to the European Heath.

Mostly seen around Sydney, though scattered individuals occur as far south as Jervis Bay. Flowering occurs from late winter to spring.

Surgeon John White collected this small plant in the late eighteenth century near Sydney. It first appeared in scientific literature in 1807 in Rees's Cyclopædia, authored by the prominent English botanist, James Edward Smith.

References

External links

ericifolium
Flora of New South Wales